Koraon is a town and a nagar panchayat in Prayagraj district in the Indian state of Uttar Pradesh.

Demographics
 India census, Koraon had a population of 12,137. Males constitute 53% of the population and females 47%. Koraon has an average literacy rate of 56%, lower than the national average of 59.5%: male literacy is 68%, and female literacy is 44%. In Koraon, 20% of the population is under 6 years of age.

References

Cities and towns in Allahabad district